Carlos Rivera Flores (born February 11, 1989 in Puebla, Mexico) is a Mexican footballer. He currently plays for Puebla in Mexico's First Division. He is a product of Puebla FC's youth system.

Career
Carlos Rivera Flores began his career playing in the Lobos de la BUAP youth system in 2007 where he played until 2009 when he was sold to cross town top division club Puebla FC. He took part of the under 20 reserved squad for Puebla FC where he showed his skills and so was promoted to the top club to take part of the 2010 Apartura tournaments.

Footnotes

External links
 
 
Stats at Mediotiempo.com
Puebla F.C. Player Profile

1989 births
Living people
Mexican footballers
Club Puebla players
Liga MX players
People from Puebla
Association football midfielders